Feusi is the surname of the following people
Arnold Feusi (1912-1998), Canadian provincial politician
Markus Feusi (born in 1968), Swiss rower
Martina Feusi (born in 1974), Swiss bobsledder

See also
Patrice Feussi (born in 1986), Cameroonian footballer